W100 may refer to:

 Sony Cyber-shot DSC-W100, a digital camera
 Mercedes-Benz W100, an automobile also known as the Mercedes-Benz 600

In sports:
 Masters athletics, an age group for athletes aged 35+
 Tennis, tournaments arranged by ITF Women's World Tennis Tour